Thomas Fairfax, 3rd Lord Fairfax of Cameron (1612–1671) was a general and Parliamentary commander-in-chief during the English Civil War.

Thomas Fairfax may also refer to:
Thomas Fairfax (Walton) (died 1505), father of Thomas Fairfax (Gilling)
Thomas Fairfax (Gilling) (died 1520), owner of Gilling Castle
Thomas Fairfax, 1st Lord Fairfax of Cameron (1560–1640), English soldier, diplomat and politician
Thomas Fairfax, 1st Viscount Fairfax (1575–1636), English landowner and politician
Thomas Fairfax (Jesuit) (1656–1716), English Jesuit
Thomas Fairfax, 5th Lord Fairfax of Cameron (1657–1710), English politician
Thomas Fairfax, 6th Lord Fairfax of Cameron (1693–1781), Scottish peer
Thomas Fairfax, 9th Lord Fairfax of Cameron (1762–1846), American-born Scottish peer
Thomas Fairfax, 13th Lord Fairfax of Cameron (1923–1964), Scottish peer and Conservative politician
Thomas Fairfax (priest) (died 1641), Anglican archdeacon in Ireland